Thomas Crawford or Tom Crawford may refer to:

 Thomas Crawford of Jordanhill (1530–1603), Scottish military strategist and Provost of Glasgow
 Thomas Crawford (sculptor) (1814–1857), American sculptor from New York
 Thomas Crawford (Canadian politician) (1852–1932), Canadian politician
 Thomas Crawford (Australian politician) (1865–1948), Australian senator
 Thomas Crawford (Wisconsin politician) (born 1952), Wisconsin politician
 Thomas Hartley Crawford (1786–1863), U.S. congressman from Pennsylvania
 Thomas H. Crawford (1803–1871), Louisville mayor
 Thomas Simpson Crawford (1875–1976), Australian politician
 Thomas Jackson Crawford (1812–1875), Scottish minister and professor of divinity
 Tom Crawford (Australian footballer) (1879–1964), Australian footballer
 Tom Crawford (English footballer) (born 1999), English footballer
 Tom Crawford (cricketer) (1910–1979), Kent cricketer
 Thomas Jefferson Crawford, a member of the Crawford family of the White Mountains
 Thomas Crawford, conductor and artistic director of the American Classical Orchestra